The Brain was a house and techno music venue in Soho, London. It was located on the former premises of the Apollo Club on 11 Wardour Street. The Brain was founded in 1989 by Sean McLusky and Mark 'Wigan' Williams. Several now famous DJs and producers played at the club, including Norman Cook, Orbital, Leftfield, Billy Nasty, Goldie, Moby, Graeme Park, The Shamen, Mixmaster Morris, Ariel, Andrew Weatherall, and A Guy Called Gerald. At the time there was little  actual live performance on the techno scene (this would change later with the advent of raves). The Brain encouraged live sets and P.As at a time when only mainstream house music used vocals on tracks.

The club is also famous for the eclectic crowd it attracted, including the likes of; Boy George, Gilles Peterson, Bobby Gillespie, Chemical Brothers, Rankin (photographer) and Jefferson Hack founders of Dazed & Confused (magazine), Paul Oakenfold, John Galliano, Rifat Ozbek, Gavin Rossdale from Bush (British band), sommelier Jamie Drummond, artists Olly and Suzi, Trip City (novel) author Trevor Miller, Tim Simenon, Neneh Cherry, Mark Moore, George Michael, The Farm, Happy Mondays,  The Stone Roses, Robert Elms, editor of The Face Sheryl Garrett, founder of Loaded (magazine) James Brown, Jonathan Pocock, Michael Sale, Simon Woodruff and Ozwald Boateng. Global celebrities like Christy Turlington, Brigitte Nielsen, and Matt Dillon were also spotted inside the venue.

Sean McLusky  went on to set up (the now defunct) Brainiak Records with Tim Fielding releasing music by such early UK electronic heroes as Ultramarine and Pete Lazonby, as well as legendary compilation albums Live at the Brain - Volumes One and Two, B-Sides and The Best of Brainiak.

In the early and mid-1990s Sean McLusky masterminded various seminal London clubs and venues including; Love Ranch at Maximus with Mark Wigan, Club UK, The Scala (club) in King's Cross, and the multi-faceted Sonic Mook Experiment.

In 1994 Tim Fielding co-founded Mr C's London nightclub The End.

See also
 Progressive electronica
 Electronic dance music

References

Nightclubs in London
Soho, London